Tunbridge was a parliamentary constituency in Kent, centred on the town of Tonbridge.  It returned one Member of Parliament (MP) to the House of Commons of the Parliament of the United Kingdom.

It was created for the 1885 general election, and abolished for the 1918 general election, when it was replaced by the new Tonbridge constituency.

Boundaries
The Sessional Divisions of Tunbridge and Tunbridge Wells, and part of the Sessional Division of Malling.

Members of Parliament

Elections

Elections in the 1880s

Elections in the 1890s

Elections in the 1900s

Elections in the 1910s 

General Election 1914–15:

Another General Election was required to take place before the end of 1915. The political parties had been making preparations for an election to take place and by the July 1914, the following candidates had been selected; 
Unionist: Herbert Spender-Clay
Liberal:

References

Parliamentary constituencies in Kent (historic)
Tonbridge
Constituencies of the Parliament of the United Kingdom established in 1885
Constituencies of the Parliament of the United Kingdom disestablished in 1918
Constituencies of the Parliament of the United Kingdom established in 1295